The 2014–15 Kosovar Cup was the football knockout competition of Kosovo in the 2014–15 season.

First round
These matches were played on 25, 26 and 2 November 2014.

|-

|}

1/8 Final
These matches were played on 10, 11 and 25, 26 March 2015.

|-

|}

Quarterfinals
These matches will be played on 22 and 23 April 2015.

|-

|}

Semifinals
These matches were played on 20 May and 3 June 2015.

First leg

Second leg

Final

References

Cup
Kosovar Cup seasons
Kosovar